Cicero Peak is a  mountain in the Black Hills of Custer County, South Dakota.

Cicero Peak is named after Cicero James Graham (1860–1930), a rancher near the base of the mountain.

Cicero Peak's fire lookout tower was built in 1939-1940, used for 34 years until 1974, declared surplus, and removed on March 19, 1980.

In 1990, nearby logging equipment sparked and started a large wildfire. This 1990 Cicero Peak Fire burned  near this mountain., including  within Custer State Park.

See also
 List of mountains in South Dakota

References

Mountains of South Dakota
Black Hills
Mountain ranges of South Dakota